Percy Elmo Henderson (1879 – 16 January 1934) was a Canadian first-class cricketer.

Henderson was born in Canada in 1879. A member of the Toronto Cricket Club, he toured England in 1910 with the Toronto I Zingari. He later made a single appearance in first-class cricket for a combined Canada and United States of America cricket team against the touring Australians at Philadelphia in 1913. Playing as a wicket-keeper, he scored he scored 2 runs in the Canada/United States first innings before being dismissed by Arthur Mailey, while in their second innings he was dismissed for 7 runs by Sid Emery, with the Australians winning the match by 409 runs. He toured England again in 1922, with a team headed by Norman Seagram, President of the Toronto Cricket Club. Henderson died at Toronto in January 1934, aged 55.

References

External links

1879 births
1934 deaths
Canadian cricketers
Canada and United States of America cricketers